The Press at Cal Poly Humboldt is a university press sponsored by Cal Poly Humboldt Library (a division of California State Polytechnic University, Humboldt).

See also

 List of English-language book publishing companies
 List of university presses

References

External links 
The Press at Cal Poly Humboldt

2015 establishments in California
California State Polytechnic University, Humboldt
Publishing companies established in 2015
Press at Cal Poly Humboldt, the